Maniola chia is a species of butterfly in the family Nymphalidae. It is endemic to Chios and Oinousses in the Aegean Islands. It is a very common butterfly found amongst grassy flowery places but it is almost impossible to distinguish the specimens from Maniola jurtina.

Flight period
The species has one brood per year (univoltine) and is on wing from late May to early August.

Food plants
Larvae feed on grasses.

References

Species info
Butterflies of Europe, Tom Tolman, 1997, Princeton University Press

External links
 Satyrinae of the Western Palearctic

Maniola
Butterflies of Europe
Butterflies described in 1987